(I Just Wanna Hug You) is a 2014 Japanese biographical romantic drama film directed by Akihiko Shiota and starring Keiko Kitagawa and Ryo Nishikido. It was released in Japan on 1 February. Japanese singer Namie Amuro sung the theme song for the film, "Tsuki". The song was released as a single in January 2014, and was certified Platinum by the Recording Industry Association of Japan.

Cast 
 Keiko Kitagawa
 Ryo Nishikido 
 Yusuke Kamiji 
 Takumi Saito 
 Aya Hirayama 
 Eriko Sato
 Megumi Sato
 Masataka Kubota
 Jimon Terakado
 Kazue Tsunogae
 Jun Kunimura
 Jun Fubuki

Reception 
The film debuted in second place by admissions and has grossed ¥276,102,650 (US$2,716,850). Mark Schilling of The Japan Times gave the film 2 out of 5 stars.

References

External links 
  
 

2014 romance films
Films directed by Akihiko Shiota
Japanese romance films
Romance films based on actual events
Toho films
2010s Japanese films
2010s Japanese-language films